Slow Flux is the seventh studio album by Canadian-American rock band Steppenwolf. The album was released in August 1974, by Epic Records. In the US it was released on the Mums Records label, a short-lived CBS Records subsidiary. It was the first of three albums the band created after reforming in 1974 before they disbanded again in 1976. "Straight Shootin' Woman" was the last Steppenwolf song to chart on the Billboard magazine Top 40. The song "Children of the Night" notably posits that the hippie movement at this time had died, and president Richard Nixon is referred to as "the fool who believed that wrong is right".

Guitarist and composer Bobby Cochran replaced Kent Henry on lead guitar in this reformed lineup, until the 1976 breakup. Cochran is the late Eddie Cochran's nephew.

This was the last Steppenwolf album that Goldy McJohn would play on. He was sacked from the band by bandleader John Kay in 1975. A horn section also played on the album.

Track listing

Personnel

Steppenwolf
 John Kay – guitar, vocals
 Goldy McJohn – keyboards
 Bobby Cochran – guitar
 George Biondo – bass guitar, backing vocals
 Jerry Edmonton – drums

Additional musicians
 Charles Black, Don Ellis, Gil Rathel, John Rosenberg, Sam Falzone – horns
 Skip Konte – Chamberlin (track 10)

Technical
 Steppenwolf – producers
 Ed Bannon – engineer
 Arnie Acosta – mastering
 Jerry Edmonton – art direction, design
 Tom Gundelfinger – photography (front cover)
 Ed Caraeff – photography (back cover & sleeve)

Charts
Album - Billboard (United States)

Singles - Billboard (United States)

References

1974 albums
Steppenwolf (band) albums